The 2013–14 Ranji Trophy was the 80th season of the Ranji Trophy. It included the final match of Sachin Tendulkar's domestic career. The competition was won by Karnataka, who defeated Maharashtra in the final.

Points system
 Basic
 Win: 6 points
 Loss: 0 points
 Draw: 1 point
 Abandoned: 1 point
 Bonus
 Win by an innings or 10 wickets: +1 point
 First innings lead in draw: +2 points

Group A

Points table

Fixtures

Group B

Points table

Fixtures

Group C

Points table

 Top two teams advance to knockout stage. and move to Groups A and B for 2014–15 Ranji Trophy

Fixtures

Knockout stage

Quarter-finals

Semi-finals

Final

Statistics

Most runs

Most wickets

See also
2013–14 Irani Cup

References

External links
Ranji Trophy, 2013/14 on ESPN Cricinfo
Ranji Trophy 2013-14 on Wisden India

Ranji Trophy seasons
Ranji Trophy
2013 in Indian cricket
2014 in Indian cricket